The  is a dual-voltage electric multiple unit (EMU) train type operated by the Metropolitan Intercity Railway Company on the Tsukuba Express line in the Kanto region of Japan.

Formation
The trains are formed as six-car sets. They are prepared for a possible lengthening to eight cars per set.

Interior
Seating accommodation consists of longitudinal seating, with priority seating sections. The interior features passenger information displays and security cameras.

Technical specifications
The trains use SiC-VVVF technology. They have aluminium car bodies and bolsterless bogies.

History
Five six-car sets were ordered in June 2018. The first set was delivered in September 2019, with the remaining sets to be delivered in December 2019 and January 2020. A second set was delivered in December 2019. Two further sets were delivered in January 2020. A fifth set was delivered in March 2020.

The train entered service on 14 March 2020.

References

External links

 Tsukuba Express official website 

Electric multiple units of Japan
3000 series
Hitachi multiple units
Train-related introductions in 2020
20 kV AC multiple units
1500 V DC multiple units of Japan